No Woman (Persian: زن ممنوع)  is a 2015 experimental, arthouse short film from Afghanistan by Yama Rauff, who was also selected for the "Fresh Legs 2016" exhibition at Galleri Heike Arndt DK in Germany and Denmark. The film debuted in Afghanistan and received recognition in March 2015 at the Women's day celebration film competition in Mazar-i-Sharif and won Best Film Prize. It featured in the December 2015 East Van Short Film Showcase in Vancouver, British Columbia, Canada and in the October 2015 International Women's Film Festival in Herat, and was projected among the finalists in the "Social Theme" section  in the June 2016 Tracce Cinematografiche Film Fest in Rome. It won the 2016 "Audience Choice: Experimental Film" award of the Women's Voices Now online film festival and received another  "Best Experimental Film Award" from Poland's 25th Euroshorts Film Festival.

Reception 
Nick Wangersky of Hollywood North Magazine felt that "in spite of the way they’re treated at times", woman do matter. He called Rauff's project an "artistic film", and expanded that it "states that women should be allowed to make decisions too." He further felt the film a "very innovative and bold way of showing how to show what’s really behind the vileness of individuals as well as how women struggle in Islamic countries."

Misty Layne of Cinemaschminema highly praised the film, writing it "has got to be one of the most beautiful films under 3 minutes I’ve ever seen. Shot entirely in black and white, out in the desert, it shares a beautiful message about women leading women, women following in the footsteps of those who fought before them for equal rights, etc. Seriously. Under 3 minutes. It’s amazing."

Najibullah Khurshid from Afghanistan's 8am daily newspaper (روزنامه هشت صبح)  noticed that " While in several scenes it shows girls being in trouble, but they don't help out each other, they do not cross eyes at each other and at one point even they lack their common aspiration.

No Woman is an artistic first three-minute short film with a community orientated story which is beyond the level of awareness of its audience in our society and other societies as well.

In the last fifteen years, no films have been made outside political attractions and formats. All have been made into the base of market demand.

Success of No Woman comes with a fresh western prespictves and looks: in the sense that no elements in the making of the film can be ignored from the perspective of a film critic, Unless it be taken simplistic, not profound."

Synopsis

Two girls standing in the desert on a road that has a sign it shows that no women are allowed to cross the line. One of them walks alone and reaches an armed person in the middle of the road with a mask. she rips the mask off and keeps walking as the person gets into his knees and cries in the road behind her. Then it shows group of girls come to the same road, they hear a gun shot, not sure of what to do. Then they see a floating mask in the wind.

Theme

No Woman shines the spotlight on the big "no" that is given to women in Afghanistan, when it comes to making decisions for themselves. Majority of women suffers from inequality, but few stands to fight against it. No Woman shows few girls on screen, but it represents story of almost every women and their aspirations and obstacles.

References

External links   

 Includes link to view the film

2010s avant-garde and experimental films
Afghan short films
2015 short films
2015 films